I WiSH was a Japanese pop group consisting of two members, Ai Kawashima and nao. Ai is responsible for the vocals and occasionally plays the piano also with nao on the keyboard or piano.

Nao learned the piano when he was 5 years old. He won the grand prix held by YAMAHA. According to his website, he has a perfect pitch.

Ai Kawashima's father was missing before she was born, and her mother died when she was just three years old. She was adopted by Kawashima’s family as an adopted daughter after she spent some time in an orphanage. She learned how to play the piano when she was only 3 years old. 
In 1999, she debuted as an Enka singer, however, it wasn’t a hit. In 2002, they started a life on the road by singing with their own electric piano as a companiment.  In 2005, March 24, Ai dissolved I WISH to concentrate on solo activity. But in 2008, the band reformed for a last single together.

History
Nao was walking on Shibuya Road, where he encountered Ai while she was playing background music with a tape recorder and singing while holding a microphone. He talked to her and helped form a group (the office was trying to help). According to the Sony Music advertising materials distributed to each record store, the following content said "Do not let outstanding talents be buried! For Kawashima to form a limited-time single band!" After that, the produced sample cassettes were sent to various record companies, and they made a contract with Sony Music and decided to make their debut.
 
In October 2002, the band's debut single "Asu e no Tobira" became the theme song of Fuji TV's variety show Love Bus (also used in Japan to broadcast the ending song "Because of You, Yaguchi Mari"). The historical theme songs of this show are popular and actual artists such as Yuzu, GLAY, Xiaoshi Band, SPITZ, etc., have become special guests. As an opportunity, their songs topped the karaoke charts, their popularity rose, and "Mukai Mukai Mirai" set a record of 900,000 copies.
 
In order to focus on individual activities, Kawashima released the album WiSH on March 24, 2005, and the group disbanded. On February 8, 2006, the compilation Best Wishes was released.

On February 21, 2008, at Ai’s birthday concert Ai Kawashima Anniversary Live ～Birth Day だからお祝いしNight!～, a one-night limited resurrection concert, was held as a special occasion. In addition to "Renai 3 Busaku", the setlist included song, "Eien to Iu Kono Shunkan Ni".

Discography

Studio albums

Singles

Compilations

External links 
 

Sony Music Entertainment Japan artists
Japanese pop music groups
Musical groups from Tokyo